Juniper Lake (Nova Scotia) could refer to the following:

Colchester County
 Juniper Lake  located at

Guysborough County
 Juniper Lake  located at 
 Juniper Lake  located at 
 Juniper Lake  located at

Halifax Regional Municipality
 Juniper Lake  located at 
 Juniper Lake  located at

Lunenburg County
 Juniper Lake  located at

References
Geographical Names Board of Canada
Explore HRM
Nova Scotia Placenames

Lakes of Nova Scotia